The Bayer designation Tau Capricorni (τ Cap, τ Capricorni) is shared by two star systems, in the constellation Capricornus:
 τ¹ Capricorni
 τ² Capricorni, being the brighter of the two, often simply called τ Capricorni
They are separated by 0.50° on the sky.

Capricorni, Tau
Capricornus (constellation)